Hot for Paris is a 1929 American pre-Code  black-and-white romantic adventure musical film. This film is believed to be lost. The film is also known as Fifì dimmi di sì in Italy and Un marido afortunado in Spain. The film length (metres) is 1710.84 m in the silent version and 2002.54 m (7 reels) in the sound version.

Cast
Victor McLaglen - John Patrick Duke
Fifi D'Orsay - Fifi Dupre
El Brendel - Axel Olson
Polly Moran - Polly
Lennox Pawle - Mr. Pratt
August Tollaire - Papa Gouset
George Fawcett - Chop Captain
Charles Judels - Charlott Gouset
Edward Dillon - Ship's Cook (as Eddie Dillon)
Rosita Marstini - Fifi's Mother
Agostino Borgato - Fifi's Father
Yola d'Avril - Yola Dupre

Soundtrack
 "Duke of Ka-ki-ak"
Music by Walter Donaldson
Lyrics by Edgar Leslie
Sung by Victor McLaglen
 "Sweet Nothings of Love" 
Music by Walter Donaldson
Lyrics by Edgar Leslie
Sung by Fifi D'Orsay
 "If You Want to See Paree"
Music by Walter Donaldson
Lyrics by Edgar Leslie
Sung by Fifi D'Orsay
 "Sing Your Little Folk Song"
Music by Walter Donaldson
Lyrics by Edgar Leslie
Sung by Fifi D'Orsay
 "Cuckoo Song"
Music by Walter Donaldson
Lyrics by Edgar Leslie
Sung by El Brendel

External links

Review by The New York Times

1929 films
Films directed by Raoul Walsh
American black-and-white films
1920s romantic musical films
Fox Film films
Transitional sound films
American romantic musical films
Lost American films
American adventure films
1929 adventure films
1920s American films